Mary Anne "Maysie" Lindsay Holford ( – ) was a British novelist and playwright 

Mary Anne Holford was born in 1829, the daughter of  Lieutenant General Sir James Lindsay, MP for Wigan, and Anne Trotter.  She married Robert Stayner Holford, MP for East Gloucestershire, in 1854.

Her play, a comedic drama called The Republican Marriage, premiered at the Olympic Theatre in November 1878, starring Marion Terry and Herbert Beerbohm Tree.  She also published a novel, Strathrowan, in 1879.

Mary Anne Holford died on 13 February 1901.

Bibliography 

 Strathrowan: A Tale of Modern Life.  3 vol.  London: Chapman and Hall, 1879.

References 

Created via preloaddraft
1829 births
1901 deaths
British women novelists